Salatiel Bartolomeu De Paiva Filho (born February 7, 1992), known as Nininho, is a Brazilian football player who plays as a right-back.

Honours
Santa Cruz
Campeonato Pernambucano: 2013, 2015
Campeonato Brasileiro Série C: 2013

External links
 Nininho at playmakerstats.com (English version of ogol.com.br)
 
 

1992 births
Living people
Brazilian footballers
Brazilian expatriate footballers
Santa Cruz Futebol Clube players
Sport Club do Recife players
América Futebol Clube (RN) players
Boa Esporte Clube players
Red Bull Brasil players
Clube do Remo players
F.C. Paços de Ferreira players
Associação Portuguesa de Desportos players
Liga Portugal 2 players
Campeonato Brasileiro Série B players
Campeonato Brasileiro Série C players
Association football midfielders
Brazilian expatriate sportspeople in Portugal
Expatriate footballers in Portugal
Sportspeople from Recife